WXMP-LP (106.5 FM) is a radio station licensed to Cordova, Tennessee, United States. The station is currently owned by Millington Community Center, Inc.

References

External links

XMP-LP
Radio stations established in 2006
2006 establishments in Tennessee
XMP-LP
Shelby County, Tennessee